Sibutu Passage is a deep channel some 18 miles (29 km) wide that separates Borneo from the Sulu Archipelago. It has a deep sill allowing entry of deep water into the Sulu basin while connecting the Sulu Sea with the Sulawesi Sea that feeds from the Pacific Ocean by the Mindanao Current.

Although H. Otley Beyer argued in favor of a settlement of the Philippines across land bridges during the last ice age, modern bathymetric soundings have shown that the centers of the Sibutu Passage and the Mindoro Strait are both deep enough that they probably still existed at that time, although the Sulu and other Philippine Islands beyond were one connected island. If verified, therefore, the Callao Man would have needed to have crossed open sea to reach the islands.

References
 Philippine Islands Sailing Directions, third edition of the bulletin prepared in the office of the U.S. Coast and Geodetic Survey at Manila by Harry L. Ford, nautical expert (Washington, DC: Bureau of Printing, 1906), p. 171
 Lambert Anthony B. Meñez, Cesar L. Villanoy and Laura T. David. "Movement of Water Across Passages Connecting Philippine Inland Sea Basins" (Marine Science Institute, University of the Philippines, November 6, 2006)

External links
Map of Sibutu Passage (channel), Philippines Encarta - MSN
Malaysia Map - Malaysia Satellite Image - Geology.com

Straits of the Philippines
Straits of Malaysia
Malaysia–Philippines border
International straits